Agus Indra Kurniawan (born 27 February 1982) is an Indonesian former professional footballer of Chinese Indonesians descent who last played as a midfielder for Liga 2 club Muba Babel United.

Club career 
On 31 December 2013, he was signed by Pelita Bandung Raya.

Honours

Club 
Petrokimia Putra
 Liga Indonesia Premier Division: 2002

International 
Indonesia
 AFF Championship runner-up: 2004
Indonesia U-21
 Hassanal Bolkiah Trophy: 2002

References

External links 
 Agus Indra Kurniawan at Liga Indonesia
 

1982 births
Indonesian people of Chinese descent
Indonesian footballers
Indonesia international footballers
2004 AFC Asian Cup players
2007 AFC Asian Cup players
Petrokimia Putra players
persija Jakarta players
gresik United players
Pelita Bandung Raya players
Muba Babel United F.C. players
Association football midfielders
Living people
People from Gresik Regency
Sportspeople from East Java